Nigriblephara is a genus of moths in the family Geometridae erected by Jeremy Daniel Holloway in 1993.

Species
Nigriblephara semiparata (Walker, 1861) Borneo
Nigriblephara radula Holloway, 1993 Borneo, Peninsular Malaysia, Sumatra
Nigriblephara cheyi Holloway, 1993 Borneo

References

Boarmiini